The North New Guinea expedition (1903) was a Dutch expedition to the still largely unknown north coast of Dutch New Guinea for the purposes of scientific exploration and to seek exploitable coal resources.

Literature
 Beaufort, L.F. de, Birds from Dutch New Guinea (Nova Guinea 5, boek 3). Leiden 1909, pp. 389–421.
 Lorentz, H.A., Eenige maanden onder de Papoea's. Leiden: E.J. Brill, 1905.
 Sande, G.A.J. van der, Ethnography and Anthropology (Nova Guinea 3). Leiden, 1906.
 Schmeltz, J.D.E., Gids voor de tentoonstelling van de ethnographische verzameling der Noord-Nieuw-Guinea-Expeditie 1903. Leiden: S.C. van Doesburgh, 1907.
 Wichmann, A., Bericht über eine im Jahre 1903 ausgeführte Reise nach Neu-Guinea. (Nova Guinea 4). Leiden, 1917.

History of New Guinea
New Guinea expeditions
Expeditions from the Netherlands